The 1899 San Jose State Spartans football team represented State Teachers College at San Jose during the 1899 college football season.  In their only season under head coach Jess Woods, the Spartans compiled a 6–3–1 record, their first ten-game schedule.  The season was highlighted by a record number of wins (six) and losses (three).  They outscored their opponents by a total of 120 to 69, although they were outscored 56 to 11 by collegiate teams.

Schedule

References

San Jose State
San Jose State Spartans football seasons
San Jose State Spartans football